is a former Japanese football player and manager.

Playing career
Nunobe was born in Takatsuki on September 23, 1973. After dropped out from Kindai University in 1993, he joined Verdy Kawasaki in 1995. He played as forward from first season and the club won the champions 1996 Emperor's Cup. However he could hardly play in the match in 1997 and he moved to Júbilo Iwata. He played many matches as substitutes and the club won the champions J1 League. In 1998, he moved to Vissel Kobe. He became a regular player as right midfielder and right side back. In 2001, he moved to his local club Cerezo Osaka. Although the club won the 2nd place 2001 Emperor's Cup, was relegated to J2 League from 2002. From 2002, he became a regular player as defensive midfielder and the club returned to J1 League in a year. In 2003, the club won the 2nd place Emperor's Cup. In 2006, he moved to Avispa Fukuoka. Although he played many matches as defensive midfielder, the club was relegated to J2 from 2007. From 2007, he played as regular player and retired end of 2008 season.

Coaching career
After retirement, Nunobe started coaching career at Avispa Fukuoka in 2009. In 2010, he moved to Kashiwa Reysol and served as a coach until 2016. In 2017, he moved to J2 League club Kyoto Sanga FC and became a manager. However the club results were bad in 2018 and he was sacked in May when the club was at 21st place of 22 clubs.

Club statistics

Managerial statistics

References

External links
 
 

1973 births
Living people
Kindai University alumni
Association football people from Osaka Prefecture
People from Takatsuki, Osaka
Japanese footballers
J1 League players
J2 League players
Tokyo Verdy players
Júbilo Iwata players
Vissel Kobe players
Cerezo Osaka players
Avispa Fukuoka players
Japanese football managers
J2 League managers
Kyoto Sanga FC managers
Association football midfielders